Jorge Luiz Barcellos Martins (born 17 April 1967) is a Brazilian football manager.

Career
Barcellos was the head coach of the Brazil women's national team at the 2007 FIFA Women's World Cup, 2008 Summer Olympics and 2012 Summer Olympics. He was appointed as head coach of Saint Louis Athletica on 26 August 2008, remaining in his role until the team's folding in May 2010.

Personal life
Barcellos was born in Nova Iguaçu, Brazil, in the municipality now known as Japeri.

References

External links
 
 Jorge Barcellos at Soccerdonna.de 

1967 births
Living people
People from Nova Iguaçu
Brazilian football managers
Women's association football managers
Brazil women's national football team managers
2007 FIFA Women's World Cup managers
Sportspeople from Rio de Janeiro (state)
Women's Professional Soccer coaches